Quintus Fabius Clodius Agrippianus Celsinus (c. 210 - after 249) was proconsul of Caria in 249. He was the son of Clodius Celsinus (born c. 185) and his wife Fabia Fuscinella (born c. 190), paternal grandson of Marcus Clodius Macrinus Hermogenianus (born c. 150), and great-grandson of Marcus Clodius Macrinius Vindex Hermogenianus (born c. 125), a proconsul of Africa c. 200. His wife was Laberia Pompeiana (born c. 225). His maternal grandparents were Quintus Fabius (born c. 165) and wife Fuscinella (born c. 165), daughter of Publius Seius Fuscianus (born c. 120), consul in 151, praefectus urbi from 187 to 189 and suffect consul in 188.

Clodius Agrippianus Celsinus was the father of
 Clodius Celsinus (born c. 245), whose son was
 Clodius Celsinus (born c. 280) and father of
 Clodius Celsinus Adelphius, praefectus urbi in 351.

These Clodii Celsini continued to practice the traditional religions of antiquity and remained unconverted in the face of Christian hegemony through at least the 4th century until Clodius Celsinus Adelphius.

Sources
Les ancêtres de Charlemagne, 1989
Continuité gentilice et continuité sénatoriale dans les familles sénatoriales romaines à l'époque impériale, 2000

3rd-century Romans
210 births
3rd-century deaths
Year of birth uncertain
Year of death uncertain
Fabius Agrippianus Celsinus, Quintus
Fabii